Gender is a subject of interest in security studies, a subfield of International relations and comparative politics.

Gender and international conflict 
Studies have examined whether the gender of leaders affects war outbreak. A 2015 study of leader characteristics and war outbreak found no significant relationship between the gender of leaders and war outbreak. A 2020 study in Security Studies by Madison Schramm and Alexandra Stark, found that female leaders are more combative in certain institutional contexts: "the effects of a leader’s gender on foreign policy decision making vary with social and institutional context. To gain and maintain status in elite policy in-groups, female leaders are incentivized to perform gender by signaling their toughness and competence through initiating conflict." A 2020 study in the Journal of Political Economy found that European "polities led by queens engaged in war more than polities led by kings. While single queens were more likely to be attacked than single kings, married queens were more likely to attack than married kings."

A 2018 study in the American Journal of Political Science found that women have historically been excluded from senior positions in defense ministries, "particularly in states that are engaged in fatal disputes, governed by military dictators, and large military spenders." A 2020 study in International Organization found that it was not democracy per se that reduces the prospects for conflict, but whether women's suffrage was ensured. The study argued, "women's more pacific preferences generate a dyadic democratic peace (i.e., between democracies), as well as a monadic peace." According to a 2016 study, survey data across 1982–2013 indicated that there were systematic differences in attitudes towards the use of force among men and women.

According to a 2020 study by Joshua A. Schwartz and Christopher W. Blair, gender stereotypes about leaders lead to audience costs, as women leaders are punished more severely for backing down after issuing threats.

Gender and civil conflict 
Studies have examined how gender relates to violence in civil wars. According to Reed M. Wood, rebel groups recruit women fighters because they are a resource in the battlefield, as well as serve important propaganda tool for domestic and international audiences. A 2021 study in International Organization found that female suicide attacks were more lethal in countries with regressive gender norms. A 2003 study by Charli Carpenter in International Organization found that discourses around gender and victimhood shaped the behavior by civilian protection agencies towards the victims of civil war violence: even though adult men were at greatest risk of massacre in the Yugoslav Wars, the focus of civilian protection agencies was overwhelmingly on protecting women and children. Research by Dara Kay Cohen has explained rape in civil wars as being rooted in strategic rationales to boost the cohesion of military groups. Laura Sjoberg points out questions in feminist scholarship to say that recognizing the role of all genders in conflict–as fighters, victims of sexual violence, soldiers of allied states, journalists, military leaders, etc–is important as it can show how societal ideas about gender affects behavior and influences people's actions.

See also 

 Feminist security studies
 Women in war
 Women in the military

References 

Security studies
International relations theory